Ouled Aissa may refer to:

Places in Algeria
Ouled Aissa, Adrar
Ouled Aissa, Boumerdès
Ouled Aïssa, Medea (located at ) 
Oulad Aïssa, Béjaïa (located at ) 
Beni Aïssi (located at ) 
Ouled Aïssa, Chlef (located at ) 
Douar Ouled Aïssa, Mostaganem (located at ) 
Douar Ouled Aïssa, Mascara (located at ) 

Places in Morocco
Oulad Aissa, El Jadida, Casablanca-Settat
Oulad Aissa, Souss-Massa
Ouled Aïssa, Taza-Al Hoceima-Taounate (located at ) 
Oulad Aïssa, Gharb-Chrarda-Beni Hssen (located at ) 
Oulad Aïssa, Meknès-Tafilalet (located at ) 
Oulad Aïssa, Marrakech-Tensift-Al Haouz (located at ) 
Douar Oulad Aïssa, Morocco (located at ) 

Places in Tunisia
Oulad Aissa, Tunisia (located at )